Gladiators is a sports entertainment television show that was an international success during the 1990s and early 2000s with versions of the show being filmed for local broadcasters in the United States, the United Kingdom, Finland, Japan, Australia, South Africa, Sweden, Nigeria, and Denmark. However, Russia, Germany, The Netherlands, South Korea and the Bahamas would also compete in international shows during the series, despite the fact that they did not have their own domestic series.

After a lengthy break, Gladiators was revived in 2008 in the UK, the US and Australia; in 2009 Lebanon created their own series featuring competitors from all over the Arab region and in 2012 Sweden brought back their version which proved most successful of all revivals, with another revival airing in Finland during 2017 and 2019. A further British revival will be aired in 2023.

The concept of the show is that athletic members of the public battle against the show's own Gladiators (often semi-professional or ex-athletes) to claim points in several events that require speed, strength and skill. In the final event of the show, "The Eliminator" the contenders race against each other (with starting times based on previous events), with the first to finish winning the episode and moving onto the next round.

A children's derivative of the concept was also made in the US, called Gladiators 2000 (a.k.a G2) (1994–1996). A UK variant of this was aired starting in 1995, called Gladiators: Train 2 Win. A one-off, celebrity derivative primetime special in the US, called Superstar American Gladiators aired on ABC on May 4, 1995.

History

1990s success 
The initial concept for the show by Dan Carr and John C. Ferraro was held in Erie, Pennsylvania, in the USA before being sold to Samuel Goldwyn Productions/MGM where the format was adapted and televised as American Gladiators with the first series airing over 1989–90. As the show progressed, new events were introduced along with new Gladiators, sometimes retiring previous Gladiators.

Following the success of American Gladiators, other countries began to produce their own versions of the show with the UK and Finland starting production in 1992. American Gladiators had already picked up a cult following in the UK after being shown on late night TV. The UK, most noticeably adapted the concept into a large arena (the National Indoor Arena in Birmingham), glamorising the show, often adapting events from the American series as well as introducing many of their own, often more high-tech. Winners from the UK and Finnish series would then go over to America, to film a special show of American Gladiators in which they competed against the current American champions along with selected athletes from other territories such as Japan and the Bahamas and South Korea.

In early 1995, the first full scale international competition was launched in which selected Gladiators from the American, Finnish and British series competed against contender champions from those three countries. A fourth country, Russia was added but as they did not have their own domestic series, the Gladiators and contenders were hand-picked by Russian TV producers. The Finnish series ceased production after International Gladiators 1.

In 1995, Australia began production of their own show, basing it on the UK series. After the first series, a three part 'Ashes' mini series was filmed in Australia, in which a selection of British and Australian Gladiators faced champions from the opposing countries. Australia then went on to compete in International Gladiators 2 along with the UK and the US. Russia also returned, even though they still did not have a domestic series. Germany and South Africa also competed even though they too did not have their own domestic series.

Decline 
After International Gladiators 2, the American Gladiators series ceased production due to falling ratings, although a live dinner show ran in Florida between 1996 and 1998. The UK and Australia continued to produce their own editions of the show, with the UK continuing to add new events to its roster (retiring some due to safety reasons) with Australia adding events from the UK series in its second and third series.

In 1996, the UK and Australia faced each other again in 'the Ashes 2' this time held in the UK Gladiator arena and an Australia vs. Russia mini series was filmed in Australia with two of the Russian Gladiators who had appeared in International Gladiators 2 appearing alongside new faces. After both of the mini series were filmed and aired, the Australian show was cancelled due to falling ratings, even though plans for a fourth domestic series had commenced, which would include a brand new event that would be exclusive to Australia. A third series of International Gladiators was planned to be filmed in Australia, but this was cancelled after ITV and LWT refused to finance another series. A third Ashes series was also planned for 1997, but this was also cancelled by the time the UK's sixth domestic series aired.

In 1997, South Africa competed against the UK in the Springbok Challenge held in the UK Gladiator arena, despite the fact that they did not have their own domestic series. Only one of the South African Gladiators who appeared in International Gladiators 2 appeared.

In 1998, there were plans for the show to have a massive overhaul, however this was cancelled after it was announced that the UK series was to be axed due to falling ratings. A final mini series in which past champions competed was filmed instead. It was at this time that South Africa finally began production of their own series and in 2000, a team of UK Gladiators and contenders went over to film the Springbok Challenge 2, a series filmed exclusively for South African TV only.

New millennium 
With the South African production in full swing, other territories began producing their own versions. Sweden began producing their own version in 2000 under the name Gladiatorerna, with the old UK apparatus being shipped over. Short lived series in Nigeria (2002) and Denmark (2003) followed.

In 2001, the South African series was overhauled, but it proved unpopular with viewers and the show was axed. Sweden continued to produce Gladiators, creating an event unique to the series, Spidercage, before being axed in 2004.

The revival 
In August 2007, NBC confirmed that a revival of American Gladiators would be produced by Reveille Productions and MGM Television to air mid season during early 2008. In addition to events from the original show, the series drew elements from the 1990s UK series as well as being updated for the new millennium in which several events would be played over water. The UK also produced a revival of Gladiators. In September 2007, the Seven Network in Australia announced that it too was reviving Gladiators, although unlike the American revival, the Australian revival was to follow the lines of its predecessor rather than be overhauled.

The first episode of the new American Gladiators premiered on Sunday 6 January 2008 proving to be a ratings hit. A second season was instantly commissioned. At the same time, it was announced that Sky One were commissioning a UK revival which would follow the basis set by the American revival.

The Australian revival premiered on 30 March 2008 with the UK series starting on Sunday 11 May. Both revivals proved instant ratings hits for their respective channels. On 12 May 2008, the second season of the American show began, with the series being moved to a bigger arena.

Due to low ratings, the Seven Network placed filming for a second series on hold and released the Gladiators from their holding contracts. NBC similarly have yet to commission a third series due to ratings for the second series being lower than expected.

The UK revival first aired in August 2008, a second series aired in January 2009. On 20 May 2009, the UK series was axed by the new controller for Sky 1, Stuart Murphy.

The Arab World launched its own version in 2009 featuring Contenders and Gladiators from all over the Arab region. It only lasted one season.

In 2012, the Swedish Gladiators, known as "Gladiatorerna", made a return to television and the revived show has proved very successful with 3 seasons so far filmed and screened, making it the most successful and longest lasting revival of the franchise. In July 2014, it was announced a 4th season would be made. This is due to be screened in early 2015.

Potential revivals
In July 2014, Arthur A. Smith company announced plans to bring American Gladiators back again for the third time and were shopping the idea to networks to give it a home, this version would have incorporated elements that were inspired by films such as The Hunger Games along with mixed martial arts.

In August 2018, actor Seth Rogen and Evan Goldberg announced plans to bring American Gladiators back again for the fourth time and are shopping the idea to distributors who are interested in the revival.

In August 2019, former UK gladiator Wolf said in a Lorraine interview, he has been begging TV producers to bring back the UK version of the show for a third time. Davina McCall expressed an interest to host the show later that month.

In September 2021, it was reported that MGM Television has teaming up with WWE for a reboot of American Gladiators that will featuring WWE wrestlers. The project is currently being pitched to broadcasters and streaming platforms.

In July 2022, Metro reported that BBC One were in talks to bring back the UK version. Filming is rumoured to take place in Sheffield Arena early next year. The revival was confirmed by the BBC on 25 August 2022.

Format 
In a standard Gladiators show, two female and two male contenders face each other and the Gladiators in anywhere from four to seven events. The line up of events differs across each show with different Gladiators playing the different events dependent on their skill type. Towards the end of the initial UK and American series, the male and female contenders did not necessarily play the same events. Contenders score points for winning against the Gladiators, with the winner having a time advantage in the last event the contenders compete in, the Eliminator.

The winner of the Eliminator goes through to the next round (or wins the series) unless a qualifying time is needed for the next round.

Shows are usually presented by a male and female host (with the exception of all but two seasons of the original American Gladiators, which were presented by two male hosts), as well as a main referee (often wearing a striped black and white shirt, in the style of an American football referee) presiding over events, handing out disqualifications or red and yellow cards to contenders or Gladiators if needed. A timekeeper is often present behind the referee but these are not always referred to or provide a speaking role. An unseen commentator will provide play by play accounts (again with the exception of the original American Gladiators series, where the on-screen hosts also provided the play by play)

The show is filmed in front of a live studio audience made up of fans and supporters of the contenders. It is not uncommon for the cameras to focus on particular crowd members or banners. Some incarnations of the show such as the Australian and original UK series have cheerleaders to provide background entertainment.

Events 
There have been 35 events involving Gladiators (as well as the Eliminator) across the incarnations. Four of the events have an alternate name in certain territories. A different selection of the events will be played in each episode. No single territory has had all thirty five events on its roster. The UK had the biggest number of events during its initial run with twenty three events.

All events were created by either the American or UK series with the exception of "Soccer Shootout" (South Africa) and "Spidercage" (Sweden). The UK notably adapted some of the American events, with the adaptations becoming the standard design for the concept. For example, the UK version of "Skytrack" would later be adopted by the Australian and American revival series whereas the UK concept of the American event "Tug-o-War" known as "Tilt" eventually superseded Tug-o-War for the 2008 American revival.

Over the course of the original UK and American series, several events were dropped, often due to safety reasons. The Eliminator was the only event which was played in every episode across every territory.

The Gladiators 
There have been more than 300 Gladiators across all participating territories. Inevitably, there has been some repeat usage of names, and there have been seven instances where the same name has been used twice in a territory for a televised series. The original American Gladiators had two different Gladiators named Lace, and the names Siren and Titan have been used in both the original and revival formats of the American show. The names Amazon, Panther, Siren and Warrior have been used for both the original and revived UK shows. The name Valkyria was used both in the original and revived series in Sweden. The names Panther, Ice, Scorpio, Tornado, Lightning, Blade, Cyclone, Fierce/Hurja, Flash, Force, Shadow, Thunder, Viper, Nitro, Tiger (Tiikeri), Terminator, Cobra, Rebel, Hurricane, Laser, Phoenix, Destroyer, Rocket, Dynamite (as Miss Dynamite), Bullit as (Bullet) and Delta have been used for both male and female Gladiators.

Most Gladiators come from either a bodybuilding or athletic background. Seven Olympic athletes have competed as Gladiators: Amazon (Sharron Davies) (UK), Nightshade (Judy Simpson) (UK), Rebel (Jennifer Stoute) (UK), Olympia (Tatiana Grigorieva) (AUS Revival), Hurricane (Breaux Greer) (US Revival), Predator (Du'aine Ladejo) (UK Revival) and Battleaxe (Shirley Webb) (UK Revival).

There have been a few instances where contenders have become Gladiators. Minna Ryynänen, a quarter-finalist from the first series of Finnish Gladiators returned as Gladiator Safiiri for the next series. UK season 3 and International Gladiators 1 champion Eunice Huthart became Gladiator Blaze. However, Eunice only competed as Blaze in non televised live shows, opting to perform as herself in future televised episodes. Australian series 2 champion and International Gladiators 2 runner up Lourene Bevaart became Glacier, American Gladiators 2008 series 1 champions Monica Carlson and Evan Dollard becoming Jet and Rocket respectively (this was actually mentioned as part of the "prize package" for this season) and after a seven-year gap, Gladiatorerna season 5 winner Patrick Lessa joined the Swedish team for the 2012 revival as Gladiator Baron Samedi, series 4 Gladiaattorit champion Janica Timonen joined the 5th series as Siren (Seireeni).

Only two Gladiators have played for two different domestic series in differing countries; Vulcan (John Seru) who was originally an Australian Gladiator who transferred to the UK team for Season 7 upon the end of the Australian series and Fox (Tammy Baker) who transferred from the UK to the South African team when the UK series finished. Laser (Tina Andrew), a UK Gladiator went on to compete as Sheena, a member of a South African team for the Springbok Challenge 1. However, she did not compete in the domestic South African series.

Some Gladiators have died since their Gladiator careers ended, including Siren, Havoc, Hawk, Rage, Atlas and Thunder from the original American Gladiators, Dynamite and Spartak from Russia, Zeke and Indra from Sweden, Sahara and Samson from South Africa, Ninja from Japan, Viking from Finland and Sapphire from Nigeria.

International versions

Domestic series 

 France: Gladiateur (Gladiator) – Cancelled in production (1993)
 Spain: Gladiadors – Cancelled in production (1994)
 Poland: Gladiatorzy (Gladius) – Cancelled in pre-production (1999)
 Italy: Gladiatore – Cancelled in production (2008)
 Turkey: Gladyiators – Cancelled in production (2009)

Zodiac TV, who worked alongside TV4 and MTV Produktion to produce Gladiatorerna and Gladiatorerne, also started to create series in Russia, Germany and Benelux (Netherlands, Belgium and Luxembourg) but they never materialised.

International series and specials 
 International Challenge of Champions 1 - 1993 - 1 off episode, filmed in USA.
 International Challenge of Champions 2 - 1994 - 1 off episode, filmed in USA.
 International Gladiators 1 - (UK, USA, Russia & Finland) - 1994 - 7 episode series, filmed in UK.
 International Gladiators 2 - (UK, USA, Russia, Australia, Germany & South Africa) - 1995 - 7 episode series, filmed in UK.
 International Gladiators 3 - Cancelled in pre-production. - 1996 - The UK had held the previous 2 international series at considerable cost to broadcaster ITV and production company LWT, who both refused to finance another series. The show was due to be filmed in Australia but with the end of the Australian domestic series, this series was cancelled as no other country agreed to host it. 
 This series would have featured Gladiators and contenders from Australia, United Kingdom, United States, Germany and Russia. Also interested in competing were New Zealand, South Korea, Japan, South Africa and a joint Scandinavian team consisting of Sweden, Finland and Norway.
 Gladiators: Battle of the Champions - 1995 - 1 off episode, filmed in UK.
 Gladiators: The Ashes 1 - (UK vs Australia) - 1995 - 3 episode series, filmed in Australia.
 Gladiators: The Ashes 2 - (UK vs Australia) - 1996 - 3 episode series, filmed in UK.
 Gladiators: Australia vs Russia - 1996 - 3 episode series, filmed in Australia.
 Gladiators: The Ashes 3 - (UK vs Australia) - 1997 - Cancelled in pre-production due to the end of the Australian domestic series.
 Gladiators: Springbok Challenge 1 (South Africa vs UK) - 1997 - 3 episode series, filmed in UK.
 Gladiators: Springbok Challenge 2 (South Africa vs UK) - 2000 - 11 episode series, filmed in South Africa. This series has never been broadcast in the UK.

Spin-offs

Other ventures

Broadband website
On January 28, 2008 a broadband website will pay homage to the original series called americangladiators.com where it features clip of the original which all have been re-digitalized as clips would reintroduce original Gladiators and give fans an update on where they are today. Future segments would also include "Best Hits" and stunts that were performed on the show.

Tour 
In 2008, MGM, Reveille and Flor-Jon Films Inc. revealed a special American Gladiators U.S. cross-country tour.

Cartoon 
MGM along with Johnny Ferraro have put into development a cartoon series based on the show but has never aired.

Movie
In 2009, Johnny Ferraro wanted to bring a live-action movie of American Gladiators. Former Legendary Pictures chief marketing officer Scott Mednick was producing the film where the goal was to create an action story that takes place inside the world Ferraro created.

30 for 30 
On April 12, 2021; it was announced by Vice Studios & ESPN Filmsthat a documentary about American Gladiators has been set for an upcoming episode of the ESPN series 30 for 30 helmed by Ben Berman.

References

External links 
 
 

 
Reality television series franchises

sv:Gladiatorerna (TV-program)